Live in New Orleans is the first DVD release by American jazz singer Norah Jones. The DVD release features Jones's concert at  House of Blues, New Orleans as part of her Come Away with Me Tour, includes ten songs from her debut album Come Away with Me as well as the covers "Comes Love" and "Bessie Smith". The DVD was released by Blue Note Records on February 25, 2003.

The DVD is also released as a bonus disc for the deluxe edition of Come Away with Me.

Track listing

Personnel

Performers
Norah Jones – vocals, acoustic and electric piano
Lee Alexander – bass
Andrew Borger – drums
Adam Levy – guitar, backing vocals
Daru – backing vocals (on track 11)

Technical
Jim Gabour – director, producer
Tom Roche – editing
Greg Crawford – mixing

Certifications

References

External links
 at Discogs

Norah Jones albums
Blue Note Records video albums
2003 video albums